Conrad McCormick is an American politician from Alaska serving as a member of the Alaska House of Representatives for district 38. A Democrat, he was previously vice mayor and member of the Bethel City Council. He ran unopposed except for write-in candidates in the 2022 Alaska House of Representatives election. McCormick and three other members of the Bush Caucus are part of a coalition with Republicans in the state house.

References

Living people
Year of birth missing (living people)
Place of birth missing (living people)
People from Bethel, Alaska
21st-century American politicians
Democratic Party members of the Alaska House of Representatives